Thomas Long (born 1936 in Ventry, County Kerry, Ireland) was an Irish Gaelic footballer. His league and championship career with the Kerry senior team spanned nine seasons from 1956 to 1964.

Long made his debut on the inter-county scene at the age of seventeen when he was selected for the Kerry minor team. He enjoyed one championship season with the minor team, however, he ended the season as All-Ireland runner-up. Long made his senior debut during the 1956 championship. Over the course of the next nine seasons, he won two All-Ireland medals in 1959 and 1962. Long also won seven Munster medals and three National Football League medals. He played his last game for Kerry in September 1964.

After being chosen on the Munster inter-provincial team for the first time in 1957, Long was a regular member of the starting fifteen at various times over the course of the following seven years. He ended his career without a Railway Cup medal.

Long's first cousin, Páidí Ó Sé, was an eight-time All-Ireland medal winner with Kerry between 1975 and 1986.

Honours

Kerry
All-Ireland Senior Football Championship (2): 1959, 1962
Munster Senior Football Championship (7): 1958, 1959, 1960, 1961, 1962, 1963, 1964
National Football League (3): 1958-59, 1960-61, 1962-63
Munster Minor Football Championship (1): 1954

References

1936 births
Living people
An Ghaeltacht Gaelic footballers
Kerry inter-county Gaelic footballers
Munster inter-provincial Gaelic footballers
Winners of two All-Ireland medals (Gaelic football)